Achille Duchêne (1866 — 1947) was a French garden designer who worked in the grand manner established by André Le Nôtre. The son of the landscaper
Henri Duchêne, Achille Duchêne was the garden designer most in demand among high French society at the turn of the twentieth century.  He built up a large office to handle the practice, which was responsible over a period of years for some six thousand gardens in France and worldwide.

Among the more notable commissions:
 Château de Vaux-le-Vicomte for Alfred Sommier
 Carolands, for Harriett Pullman Carolan in Hillsborough, California, USA
 Château de Champs, Champs-sur-Marne, for Comte Louis Cahen d'Anvers
 Château de Courances, for the marquise Jean de Ganay
 Château du Marais, for comte Boni de Castellane (1903-1906)
 Château de Breteuil (Yvelines) (with his father Henri Duchêne)
 Château de Rosny-sur-Seine (Yvelines), for Paul Lebaudy (end of the nineteenth century)
 Château de Voisins at Saint-Hilarion (Yvelines), for Comte Edmond de Fels
 Water parterres of Blenheim Palace for the ninth Duke of Marlborough
 Château de Langeais
 Château de Sassy (Orne), about 1925, for Gaston d'Audiffret
 Garden of the Hôtel Porgès, 18 avenue Montaigne, Paris 8e, for Jules Porgès
 Gardens of the Palais Rose, avenue Foch, for Boni de Castellane
 Nordkirchen Schlossgarten, Nordkirchen, Germany
 Château de la Verrerie (Le Creusot), for the Schneider family (1904-1908)
 Garden at the Cloître de l'Abbaye de Royaumont (1912)
 The Errázuriz Palace, the private residence of Josefina de Alvear and Matias Errázuriz, in Buenos Aires, Argentina (1914)
 The Bosch Palace, the private residence of Elisa de Alvear and Ernesto Bosch, in Buenos Aires, Argentina (1915)
 Park of Schoppenwihr at Ostheim (Haut-Rhin), garden restoration for Général Baron de Berckheim
 Gardens of Eijsden Castle (around 1900), near Maastricht, the Netherlands 
 Mikes kastély, Zabola Estate, Transylvania, Romania, general plan for Count Armin Mikes

In 1935, Achille Duchêne published Les jardins de l'avenir, in which he affirmed that there was no future for grand aristocratic parks, and that for the future one must think in terms of simplified maintenance in reduced scale.

Further reading
Dwyer, Michael Middleton. Carolands. Redwood City, CA: San Mateo County Historical Association, 2006.

See also
 Landscape architecture

References 

French landscape and garden designers
1866 births
1947 deaths
People from Lorient